Mao Feilian (born 30 July 1993) is a Chinese swimmer. He competed in the men's 200 metre breaststroke event at the 2016 Summer Olympics.

References

External links
 

1993 births
Living people
Olympic swimmers of China
Swimmers at the 2016 Summer Olympics
Place of birth missing (living people)
Asian Games medalists in swimming
Swimmers at the 2014 Asian Games
Asian Games gold medalists for China
Asian Games silver medalists for China
Medalists at the 2014 Asian Games
Chinese male breaststroke swimmers
21st-century Chinese people